R-110, R110, R.110, R 110 or variant may refer to:

Road 110
Route 110 (highway 110)
R110 road (Ireland)
Freon R-110 (hexachloroethane), see List of refrigerants
R110, designation for the prototype New Technology Train on the New York City Subway, specifically:
R110A (New York City Subway car)
R110B (New York City Subway car)
R110, the fictional robot, see TimeSplitters

See also
 Škoda 110 R